U.S. Coast Guard Port Security Units are deployable specialized units organized for sustained force protection operations. They provide Anti-Terrorism Force Protection (ATFP) missions, which include harbor and port defense, protection of High Value Assets (HVAs) and Sea Lines of Communications (SLOCs), and coastal surveillance. PSUs are expeditionary units that conduct OCONUS (Outside of Continental United States) missions in support of a requesting regional combatant commander. PSUs usually operate under the direction of the Coast Guard's Pacific Area (PACAREA) command but are unique in that they are the only Coast Guard units that can be quickly requested by the Department of Defense.

PSUs often operate and integrate with Navy Expeditionary Combat Command (NECC) elements, such as Maritime Expeditionary Security Squadrons (MSRONs), within a Maritime Expeditionary Security Group. PSUs are also the only Coast Guard element that provide ground combat security capabilities to the Coast Guard.

PSUs were originally part of the Coast Guard's Deployable Operations Group (DOG) until it was decommissioned; PSUs are now a part of the reorganized Deployable Specialized Forces (DSF), which includes Maritime Security Response Teams (MSRTs), Maritime Safety & Security Teams (MSSTs), and Tactical Law Enforcement Teams (TACLETS).

History 

The Port Security program of the Coast Guard began as a result of the Black Tom explosion and the passage of the Espionage Act of 1917.  The Coast Guard's Captain of the Ports (COTPs) were given responsibility for the security of port areas under this act.  During World War I, port security operations were conducted by active-duty personnel.

After the war, interest in port security waned until pictures of burning ships visible from U.S. shores, as the country entered World War II, rekindled media and public attention.  The Temporary Reserve was created and made up of armed volunteers under command of the Captain of the Port. Over 125,000 citizens would eventually serve as Temporary Reserves.

During the early 1980s, Department of Defense planners formally identified the need for port security forces in OCONUS (Outside of Continental United States) seaports. Dialogue began between the Army, Navy, and Coast Guard, and the concept of the deployable Port Security Unit (PSU) was born. In January 1985, the Commandant of the Coast Guard approved three national PSUs to respond to the requirements of Department of Defense operations plans. The three units were located in Coast Guard District 9 at Buffalo, New York; Cleveland, Ohio; and Milwaukee, Wisconsin.

In addition to more recent operations around the world, PSUs were first deployed to the Persian Gulf during Operation Desert Storm in 1990. They operated in Haiti during Operation Uphold Democracy in 1994, responded to Port-au-Prince immediately after the devastating 2010 earthquake, and responded to various natural disasters in the United States, such as Hurricane Maria and Hurricane Ida. In December 2000, PSU 309 from Port Clinton, Ohio was deployed to the Middle East to provide vital force protection for U.S. Navy assets following the attack on the USS Cole.

PSUs have played an active role during the War on Terror and have been deployed on numerous operations such as Operation Noble Eagle, Operation Enduring Freedom, and Operation Iraqi Freedom.

Insignia 
There are two insignias for PSU members; the pewter color insignia is for enlisted members and gold color insignia is for officers. It is only earned by a small number of Coast Guardsmen (approx. 1%) and is primarily a Coast Guard Reserve qualification badge.

The design for the pin was developed in 1991 by Reserve Coast Guardsman, Storekeeper First Class Terry D. Jelcick while sitting on his bunk at Batar Camp, Dammam, Saudi Arabia in the evenings after work. Jelcick is now retired and is a former member of PSU 312 based in San Francisco, California.

The parts of the insignia are:
 Coast Guard Shield: represents the Coast Guard authority.
 Trident: represents maritime defense, expeditionary, and victory.
 Crossed Swords: represent the PSUs operating in joint military environments.
 Seahorses: represent mobility.
 Waves: represent our seagoing heritage.

Capabilities 
PSUs are the Coast Guard's expeditionary forces and are a quick response force capable of rapid worldwide deployment They can deploy within 96 hours and establish operations within 24 hours of arrival. They provide security for forward deployed base camps and ports around the world where needed. Some of the unit's capabilities include, but are not limited to:
 Physical Security
 Anti-Piracy
 Maritime Interdiction
 CBRN Defense
 Military Combat Operations
 Humanitarian Aid
 Point-Defense of strategic shipping routes, designated Critical infrastructure, and high value assets.

Equipment 

Each PSU has 6 fast and maneuverable 32' Transportable Port Security Boats (TPSBs). The PSU has a large suite of weapons available to them, compared to most Coast Guard units. Each unit is outfitted with spare material, pick-up trucks, boat trailers, transportable kitchens, tents, and Department of Defense-compatible radios. They maintain an inventory of equipment and spare parts to sustain operations for up to 90 days. Ongoing logistics support provides routine replenishment. All personnel have individual gear for field operations.

Organization 
Each PSU is staffed by 140 reservists and 6 active-duty personnel (one officer and 5 first-class petty officers).  The officer may or may not be a reservist. Personnel prepare for contingency operations during weekend drills and normally participate in exercises and specialized training during their annual active-duty training (ADT).

There are 8 Port Security Units:
 PSU 301: Joint Base Cape Cod, Massachusetts
 PSU 305: Joint Base Langley–Eustis, Virginia
 PSU 307: Coast Guard Air Station Clearwater, Florida
 PSU 308: Stennis Space Center, Mississippi
 PSU 309: Camp Perry, Ohio
 PSU 311: Coast Guard Base Los Angeles/Long Beach, California
 PSU 312: Coast Guard Base Alameda, California
 PSU 313: Naval Station Everett, Washington

PSUs may operate independently or support, train or integrate with other units, such as:
 United States Coast Guard: Deployable Specialized Forces
 United States Marine Corps: Fleet Anti-Terrorism Security Teams (FAST)
 United States Army: Military Police and United States Army Corps of Engineers
 United States Air Force: Security Forces
 United States Navy: Coastal Riverine Force elements including, Maritime Expeditionary Security Squadrons (MSRONs), Seabees, Explosive Ordnance Disposal (EOD) Detachments and Mobile Diving and Salvage Units

Waterside Security Division 
The Waterside Security Division (WSD) is equipped with six Kvichak (Vigor) 32' Transportable Port Security Boats (TPSBs) (four operational, one in maintenance, one pre-staged theater spare), which are the fourth generation of the Transportable Security Boats (TPSBs) used by the Coast Guard for the port security missions. These boats are armed with three mounted machine guns, in addition to the crew's personal weapons.

The main purpose of the Waterside Security Division is to provide maritime protection to key High Value Assets (HVAs), such as warships and military supply vessels, military bases, ports, harbors, and piers. Through the use of vigilant escort and patrol techniques, the HVA is protected from asymmetrical threats, such as assaults by small boats or swimmers.

The Waterside Security Division consists of Boatswain's Mates (BMs), Gunner's Mates (GMs), Machinery Technicians (MKs), and Maritime Law Enforcement Specialists (MEs), led by a division officer (DIVO) and assistant division officer (ADIVO).  Each Transportable Security Boat (TPSB) is crewed by enlisted personnel, consisting of a Tactical Coxswain and Tactical Boat Crew members, one of which is a qualified Engineer.

Members of the Waterside Security Division use a variety of light and crew-served weapons, including 7.62mm M240B Machine Guns,.50 caliber M2 Machine Guns, M4 Carbines, .40 S&W SIG Sauer P229R DAK Service Pistols, 40mm M203 grenade launchers, and 12 Gauge Remington 870 Shotguns.

Shoreside Security Division 
The Shoreside Security Division (SSD) is the ground element of the PSUs. They are often tasked with providing protection to vessels in security zones and pier areas and security for internal unit functions, such as joint command areas, communications centers, berthing areas, entry control points (ECP), and vehicle control points (VCP).  SSD personnel are also trained in defensive position construction, individual movements, and patrolling,

The Shoreside Security Division consists of Maritime Law Enforcement Specialists (MEs), led by a division officer (DIVO) and assistant division officer (ADIVO). It is subdivided into squads with 3 four-person fireteams each. Each squad and fireteam has a designated squad or fireteam leader.

Members of the Shoreside Security Division use a variety of light and crew-served weapons, including 7.62mm M240B Machine Guns,.50 caliber M2 Machine Guns, M4 Carbines, .40 S&W SIG Sauer P229R DAK Service Pistols, 40mm M203 grenade launchers, and 12 Gauge Remington 870 Shotguns.

Weapons Division 
The Weapons Division ensures that the unit is properly armed, equipped, and trained for exercises, operations, or incidents that the PSU may respond to. The Weapons Division consists of a Weapons Officer (WEPO) and multiple Gunner's Mates (GMs).  The division maintains a variety of weaponry, including the .50 caliber M2 Machine Gun, 7.62mm M240B Machine Gun, M4 Carbine, M16A2 Rifle, 12 Gauge Remington 870 shotgun (lethal and non-lethal), 40mm M203 grenade launcher, and the .40 S&W SIG Sauer P229R DAK service pistol.

Operations 

PSUs are capable of worldwide deployment in national defense regional contingency environments. PSUs conduct layered defensive operations to protect High Value Assets (HVAs) within the protected waters of a port or harbor. Operating environments include operations from shore sites, barges, or other moored platforms (including oil platforms). PSUs typically have enough supplies to operate between 15 to 30 days without resupply.

PSUs will normally operate independently but may operate with U.S. Navy Navy Expeditionary Combat Command (NECC). PSUs are capable of conducting continuous boat operations with three or four boats underway simultaneously. An additional boat will be crewed and mechanically ready at all times as a ready response boat. The remainder of the boats may be undergoing maintenance or repair or used for spares. Boat hulls can be expected on station (not including transit and maintenance time) 18 hours per day when more than one boat is undergoing maintenance. During high threat conditions, PSUs are capable of conducting continuous operations with four operational boats for a maximum period of 24 hours.

See also 
 Port Security Badge
 United States Coast Guard Reserve
 Maritime Safety and Security Team
 Law Enforcement Detachments
 Joint Maritime Training Center
 Patrol Forces Southwest Asia

References

External links 
 Fact Card
 PSU History: USCG Historian's Website

Units and organizations of the United States Coast Guard
United States Coast Guard Reserve